Dadar Adesh (দাদার আদেশ) is a 2005 Bengali  action drama film directed by Anup Sengupta and produced by Anup Sengupta, Nimai Panja, Paban Kanoria, Piya Sengupta. The film features actors Prosenjit Chatterjee, Anu Chowdhury, Ranjit Mallick, Abhishek Chatterjee in the lead roles. Music of the film has been composed by Ashok Bhadra. The film is a remake of the 1996 Malayalam film Hitler, starring Mammootty and Shobhana.

Cast 
 Prosenjit Chatterjee as Bijoy Roy
 Anu Chowdhury as Puja Chowdhury, Bijoy's love interest
 Ranjit Mallick as Krishnokanto Roy, Bijoy's father 
 Abhishek Chatterjee as Raj Chowdhury, Puja's brother & Seema's husband
 Piya Sengupta as Seema Roy, Bijoy's sister
 Rupanjana Mitra as Jhuma Roy
 Priyanka Sarkar as Titli Roy
 Joy Badlani as Kali, a dreaded goon & then mafia leader
 Shankar Chakraborty as Munna, Kali's younger brother
 Ritoja Majumder as Asha Roy
 Lokesh Ghosh as Kartik Ghosh
 Ramen Roy Chowdhury as Bimal Chowdhury, Puja & Raj's father
 Anamika Saha as Shanti Chowdhury, Puja & Raj's mother

Soundtrack

References 

Bengali-language Indian films
2005 films
2000s Bengali-language films
Films directed by Anup Sengupta
Bengali remakes of Malayalam films